Mbao FC is a football club from Mwanza, Tanzania. 'Mbao' is the Swahili word for 'wood'.

History

2015/2016
They won promotion to the Tanzanian Premier League after the 2015/2016 season. They were promoted after a match fixing scandal forced other teams to relegate.

2016/2017
In the 2016/2017 season they are one of two teams from Mwanza playing in the Premier League. The other being Toto African.

2017
In May 2017, Mbao FC played the final of the Azam Sports Federation Cup, against Simba Sports Club. Simba won the game 2–1 in extra time.

They play their home games at CCM Kirumba Stadium.

2019/20
Mbao FC were relegated to the second division after losing a relegation playoff match to Ihefu SC.

References

Football clubs in Tanzania
Mwanza
Mwanza Region